Fernando Luís Brederodes Pires (born 7 February 1951), commonly known as Fernando, is a Brazilian football coach and former player.

Coaching career
Pires coached Brazil in the inaugural 1991 FIFA Women's World Cup.

References

1951 births
Living people
Brazilian footballers
Brazilian football managers
Fluminense FC players
Figueirense FC players
CR Flamengo footballers
Associação Portuguesa de Desportos players
F.C. Penafiel players
Brazilian expatriate footballers
Expatriate footballers in Portugal
Association football defenders
1991 FIFA Women's World Cup managers
Sportspeople from Recife